The Dosse (Germanized: Dossen) is a mountain of the Rigi massif, located on the border between the Swiss cantons of Lucerne and Schwyz. The mountain overlooks Lake Lucerne, near Vitznau. It is the highest point of the massif in the canton of Lucerne. The slightly lower peak only 200m northwest of it is called Chli Dosse.

References

External links
Rigi Dossen on Hikr

Mountains of the Alps
Mountains of the canton of Lucerne
Mountains of the canton of Schwyz
Lucerne–Schwyz border
Mountains of Switzerland